Austrarchaea binfordae is a species of spider in the genus Austrarchaea. It was described by Rix & Harvey in 2011 after being identified near Wauchope in New South Wales, Australia. It is named for the US arachnologist, Greta Binford.

References

Archaeidae
Spiders of Australia
Spiders described in 2011